East Londonderry or East Derry can refer to:

 The eastern part of County Londonderry
 The eastern part of the city of Derry
 East Londonderry (Assembly constituency)
 East Londonderry (UK Parliament constituency)